is a former international table tennis player from Japan.

Table tennis career
From 1964 to 1967 she won several medals in singles, doubles, and team events in the World Table Tennis Championships and in the Asian Table Tennis Championships.

The seven World Championship medals  included two gold medals in the singles at the 1965 World Table Tennis Championships and team event at the 1967 World Table Tennis Championships.

See also
 List of table tennis players
 List of World Table Tennis Championships medalists

References

External links
About Naoko Fukatsu 

1944 births
Living people
Japanese female table tennis players
People from Okazaki, Aichi
Asian Games medalists in table tennis
Table tennis players at the 1966 Asian Games
Asian Games gold medalists for Japan
Medalists at the 1966 Asian Games